Gomathi Marimuthu is an Indian Track and field middle-distance runner who won the gold medal in the women's 800 m at the 2019 Asian Athletics Championships held in Doha, Qatar. She was born on 8 February in the year 1989 in Tamil Nadu. She was banned for four years after failing a doping test

References

Tamil sportspeople
1989 births
Living people
Indian female sprinters
Athletes from Tamil Nadu
Asian Athletics Championships winners